The Los Angeles Police Department (LAPD), the municipal law enforcement agency of the city of Los Angeles, California, maintains and uses a variety of resources that allow its officers to effectively perform their duties. The LAPD's organization is complex, with the department divided into bureaus and offices that oversee functions and manage specialized units. The LAPD's resources include the department's divisions, transportation, communications, and technology.

Police stations
The LAPD's deployment of officers has reflected the growth and changes of Los Angeles since the late 19th century. The earliest LAPD police station (or "division", originating from the "Patrol Division") was Central Division, located in Downtown Los Angeles on the southeast corner of 1st and Hill.  This station opened in 1896 and was the department's first dedicated police station (another had been located at 2nd and Spring, but was possibly a leased or rented storefront type of set-up). The Central Jail was located directly south of it. "Old Central", as it came to be known, housed not only Central Division but also many of the department's headquarters units until its closure in about 1955 in favor of Parker Center and Central Community Police Station.

The city's largest growth period was from approximately the late 19th century through the 1930s when the city grew at a geometric rate. Approximately 100 smaller portions were added to the original five square mile pueblo. Of these, about 90 were formerly unincorporated areas. The remaining ten portions had been their own incorporated cities, and included the cities of Watts, Venice, Hollywood, San Pedro, Wilmington, Barnes, Hyde Park, Eagle Rock, Sawtelle, and Tujunga. When the city consolidated another existing city, its police officers became LAPD officers with corresponding ranks and titles at the LAPD, per the city charter. The LAPD would then create a new division named after the city that had been consolidated and would continue using the former city's police station, usually replacing these facilities with larger renamed police stations within a few years.

The following is a list of LAPD stations, along with their original division numbers:

01 Central Police Station, 251 East 6th Street 90014 
02 Rampart Police Station, 1401 West 6th Street 90017
03 Southwest Police Station, 1546 West Martin Luther King Jr. Boulevard 90062
04 Hollenbeck Police Station, 2111 East 1st St 90033
05 San Pedro Police Station, 2175 John S Gibson Boulevard 90731
06 Hollywood Police Station, 1358 North Wilcox Avenue 90028
07 Wilshire Police Station, 4861 West Venice Boulevard 90019
08 West Los Angeles Police Station, 1663 South Butler Avenue 90025
09 Van Nuys Police Station, 6240 Sylmar Avenue 91401
10 West Valley Substation, 19020 West Vanowen Street 91335
11 Northeast Police Station, 3353 North San Fernando Road 90065
12 77th Street Police Station,7600 South Broadway 90003
13 Newton Street Police Station, 3400 South Central Ave 90011
14 Pacific Police Station, 12312 West Culver Boulevard 90066
15 North Hollywood Police Station, 11640 South Burbank Boulevard 91601
16 Foothill Police Station, 12760 West Osborne Street 91331
17 Devonshire Police Station, 10250 North Etiwanda Avenue 91324
18 Southeast Police Station, 145 West 108th Street 90061
19 Mission Police Station, 11121 North Sepulveda Boulevard 91345
20 Olympic Police Station, 1130 South Vermont Avenue 90006
21 Topanga Police Station, 21501 West Schoenborn Street 91304

Transportation

Patrol cars

The Ford Crown Victoria Police Interceptor is one of the LAPD's three primary patrol sedans, the other two being the Dodge Charger Pursuit and the Ford Police Interceptor Sedan. Chevrolet Impala 9C1s were also purchased in small numbers in the 2000s. With the Ford Crown Victoria's discontinuation in 2011 and the Ford Taurus' discontinuation in 2019, the LAPD has shifted from sedans to crossovers, purchasing primarily the Ford Police Interceptor Utility. The LAPD also uses a small number of Chevrolet Tahoe SUVs, though they are gradually decommissioning them due to their poor gas mileage.

LAPD vehicles are ordered painted in black clearcoat with the roof, doors, and pillars painted white from the factory, though some vehicles assigned to special divisions, such as K-9 or the bomb squad, may be painted all-white or all-black. Options available from Ford ordered by the LAPD today include dual pillar-mounted Unity spotlights, 16-inch heavy duty steel wheels with chrome center caps, and ballistic panels within the two front doors. Most LAPD patrol cars bear at least two rear bumper stickers: one reading "There's NO Excuse - For Domestic Violence" and another for "Watch The Road - Operation Traffix".  On the rear side panel is a black and white sticker that reads "EMERGENCY DIAL 9-1-1 Fire Police Medical."  The front doors bear the seal of the city of Los Angeles, the department slogan "to protect and to serve", and the citywide five-digit "shop number" and city department name ("POLICE"). The last three numbers of the shop number (used to identify all vehicles operated by the city) are reprinted on the roof to help air units visually identify cars. On the trunk is a number that identifies which division the unit belongs to (e.g., a 25 would be "South Traffic Division" or a 3 would be "Southwest Area"). The LAPD has used the same black-and-white paint scheme and markings since roughly 1940 with minimal modifications.

Unmarked cars 

The LAPD has many unmarked vehicles, primarily used by special units such as gang units, detectives, SWAT, and some traffic units. They are usually assigned Ford Crown Victorias, Ford Explorers, Dodge Chargers, Chevrolet Impalas, and Chevrolet Tahoes.

Certain investigative units, such as detectives, vice, special investigations, homicide units, may be assigned civilian vehicles that are not normally used for police work, ranging from civilian models of cruisers (such as Ford Crown Victorias or Ford Explorers) to common civilian vehicles (such as Honda Civics and Chevrolet Silverados). These differentiate from traditional unmarked cruisers due to their prevalence among regular civilian traffic and their lack of police equipment.

Special vehicles 

The LAPD Metropolitan Division's SWAT operates a fleet of unmarked Chevrolet Suburbans and Chevrolet Tahoes alongside regular unmarked cruisers. They also operate a fleet of armored SWAT vehicles, primarily Lenco BearCats and possibly also a Cadillac Gage Commando, which are designated as "Rescue" vehicles. As well as specialized variant M113 APCs.

The bomb squad and the K-9 unit both operate a mix of all-white cruisers and pickup trucks (the bomb squad also operates all-black vehicles as well), such as the Ford Police Interceptor Utility and the GMC Sierra. The bomb squad also operated a custom Peterbilt 367 with a Total Containment Vessel until June 2021, when it was destroyed after illegal fireworks accidentally detonated while being stored in the truck.

The LAPD uses various trucks, including a Peterbilt used to move a mobile command center trailer, and several retired military flatbeds acquired from the 1033 Program. At least two modified Pierce rescue trucks are used by SWAT and the bomb squad. The LAPD also uses several vans, with white Ford E-Series, Ford Transit, Chevrolet Express, and Chevrolet Astro vans being used for transport, administrative, and special purposes. The LAPD Honor Guard is transported in a white Ford Transit.

The LAPD briefly had a Lamborghini Gallardo with a black-and-white livery and patrol-specification lighting. The Gallardo was loaned to the department in 2014 and was used to promote the Air Support Division at several promotional events. As it was on loan and has not made any further appearances, it is likely no longer used by the department. Other vehicles the LAPD uses to promote recruitment include the Hummer H3 and the GMC Yukon.

On September 11, 2015, the Mayor of Los Angeles announced a plan to lease 160 battery electric vehicles and 128 plug-in hybrids for city department use. In 2016, the LAPD leased a Tesla Model S and a BMW i3 for testing purposes, and decided to purchase 100 BMW i3s for administrative and non-emergency duties. However, they were almost never used due to concerns over their low mileage, and were decommissioned and sold in bulk for $19,000 each in 2020.

A cruiser with 1-Adam-12 markings is used by Central Division to reward officers for "outstanding duty performance". It was activated in 2003. It is unknown if the vehicle is still used. A 2001 Ford Crown Victoria with an older Federal Signal Aerodynic lightbar, used by the LAPD before the adoption of the Ford Crown Victoria, is used by officers assigned to patrol Panorama Mall; despite its visible age, it is still in service as of November 2020.

Motorcycles

Kawasaki police motorcycles have historically represented the majority of the motorcycle vehicles in the LAPD's motor pool. In recent years, the LAPD has shifted to using Harley-Davidson FLHP and BMW R1200RT-P motorcycles. LAPD motorcycles are painted black and white and carry a radio, emergency lights, a long arm, police equipment, and police documentation. The LAPD also operates a smaller fleet of electric motorcycles and electric scooters. Motorcycle units are not deployed during rainy or inclement weather, during which all traffic units patrol in cruisers.

Aircraft

The LAPD Air Support Division maintains 21 helicopters and 1 fixed-wing aircraft. Older helicopters were painted silver and blue; newer models use the traditional black-and-white paint schemes, similar to patrol cars. The letters "LAPD" appear on the top side of the aircraft in blue, capital letters. LAPD air units (known as "Airships") use Eurocopter AS350B2 AStars, Bell 206B-IIIs, and the Bell 412. They are equipped with a wide variety of electronics and equipment that include a 30 million candlepower Nightsun spotlight, optical FLIR cameras and electronically stabilized binoculars, a LoJack signal receiver, and police radios. The Air Support Division operates from LAPD Hooper Heliport in downtown Los Angeles, and Van Nuys Airport.

Two officers with at least three years of patrol car service fly in each air unit; they are armed and able to land and make arrests in areas not accessible by other means. Air units provide information with regards to barricaded suspects, suspects fleeing on foot or in a vehicle, violent incidents involving large numbers of individuals, and then some. Air units are automatically requested when initiating a traffic stop on a Code 5 vehicle, or suspect with known wants or warrants that are a felony, to limit the potential for a vehicle pursuit.

Air units do not fly during poor or inclement weather (particularly dense fog) due to aviation safety procedures.

Bicycles
Occasionally, police bicycle units patrol, usually in large numbers and especially during special events to provide fast and easy access to police assistance. Bicycle units may go on patrols lasting between 10 and 25 miles during any given beat. Bicycle units train rigorously in the hills of Elysian Park near Academy Road and Dodger Stadium. The bicycles used by the Los Angeles Police Department are manufactured by Giant.

Horses
Metropolitan Division also has a Mounted Unit that consists of approximately 40 police horses. These are normally used for riots and special events. Specially trained officers also wear their uniform along with boots and a Stetson hat with the same police shield as the one worn on the brim of the traditional police hat.  Equestrian units normally appear in the city only on special occasions. Metro Division is also responsible for the K-9 units (which also wear ballistic vests). Narcotics and Bomb K-9 units belong to different divisions. The reason the police force uses Mounted Police is the added height and visibility that the horses give their riders allows officers to observe a wider area and be easier to spot in a crowd.

Radio communications

Inspired by a contest in 1924, Police Chief R. Lee Heath ordered his staff to investigate the use of radio communications to "more quickly dispatch officers to where they are needed."  It was not until Police Chief Roy E. Steckel, however, that the department was assigned its first Federal Communications Commission license. On May 1, 1931, KGPL, the LAPD's dedicated radio callsign, began broadcasting at 1712 kHz, just above the commercial radio broadcasting frequencies; this was later changed to 1730 kHz. Any citizen could monitor outgoing police radio traffic on their home sets. The system was "one way" until the mid-1930s when mobile transmitters were installed in patrol units. In 1949, the FCC changed KGPL's callsign to KMA367. This was later changed again at an unspecified point in time; the LAPD's current primary radio callsign is KJC625. Other frequencies are also used for varying divisions and purposes, such as WPLQ343 for talkaround (direct unit-to-unit communications), WPRJ338 for detectives, and WIL868 for tactical operations. KMA367 is still used by a handful of LAPD divisions, but it is no longer the primary radio callsign for a majority of the department.

Emergency calls for police service are handled by the Communications Division. First, an Emergency Board Operator answers calls placed to 911 (with a lower number of operators assigned to the non-emergency 1-877-ASK-LAPD). A call for service is assigned an incident number, which resets to the number 1—citywide—at midnight each night. Upon receiving the call for service, the Radio Telephone Operator (RTO) will go on the air to broadcast to the division (with the option to simulcast on bureau-wide, geographically adjacent or citywide frequencies).

RTOs provide the following information in what is known as a crime broadcast:

A set of beep tones based on call priority (none for low priority, three for priority, four for major priority),
to whom this message is intended (a particular unit, a certain division's units, nearby units, any available units, or all units receiving the transmission),
the type of incident that just occurred (usually per the California Penal Code, but sometimes an abbreviation established by the Communications Division),
how long ago the incident occurred,
the location or address of the incident,
the number of suspects (if more than one),
a description of the suspect or suspects, their clothing and/or other uniquely identifiable attributes if available, any weapons they may have,
a description of the suspect vehicle or vehicle(s), including type, make, model, color, and license plate number (if suspect is using a vehicle, and if such information is available),
additional details, such as information about the "PR" (person reporting) or simply an order to "monitor comments for further" (a direction to responding officers to read about the incident on their mobile data terminals),
a response code (Code 3 for emergency lights and sirens, Code 2-High for lights and no sirens, Code 2 for no lights and no sirens),
a request for the responding units to identify themselves with their callsigns, and
the incident number and the "RD" or reporting district (a numbered area within the division).

A fictitious example of an LAPD dispatch radio transmission would be:Any available Central unit, a 211 just occurred at 714 South Broadway Street. Suspect is a male, white, six-foot seven, approximately 280 pounds; shaved head, black eyes, white shirt, blue jeans. Vehicle is a dark grey late-model Chevrolet Malibu. Weapon used was a semi-automatic handgun. Monitor comments for additional. Units to handle Code 3, identify. Incident number 171 in RD 193.Without using jargon, this radio transmission reports an armed robbery at 714 South Broadway Street, followed by the suspect's physical description, vehicle description, and weapon, an order to read information in the MDT, and a request for the responding units to identify themselves using their callsign and respond to the scene with emergency lights and sirens, ending with the call's daily incident number, the 171st call of the day.

Radio codes 
 Code 1: Answer radio
 Code 2: Respond immediately to location, no lights or siren, obey all traffic laws
 Code 3: Respond immediately with lights and siren to location, exemption from traffic laws permitted with lights and siren
 Code 4: No further units needed to respond, return to patrol
 Code 4-Adam: No further units needed to respond, suspect not in custody, units already en route to the scene position or patrol in strategic areas near the scene
 Code 5: Stakeout, marked police cars must avoid location
 Code 6: Unit has arrived to location, officers investigating
 Code 6-Adam: Unit has arrived, may need further assistance from nearby units
 Code 6-Charles: Dangerous suspect (usually felony want or warrant reported); units stand-by for assistance
 Code 7: Meal break request (no longer used)
 Code 8: Fire reported in area of high fire hazard or threat to firefighting personnel
 Code 8-Adam: Units requested to scene of fire for traffic and crowd control
 Code 10: request to clear frequency for broadcast of want/warrant information
 Code 12: False alarm
 Code 20: Notify media (or media already on scene)
 Code 30: Burglar alarm (can be Code 30-Silent)
 Code 37: Vehicle is reported stolen (Code 6-Charles is given if vehicle license check produces dangerous suspect or felony want/warrant information)
 Code 99: Emergency (e.g. officer under attack), all units respond
 Code 100: Units in position to intercept fleeing suspect
 Code Robert: Request for deployment of rifle to location
 Code Sam: Request for deployment of shotgun slug ammunition to location
 Code Tom: Request for deployment of taser to location

A unit that responds Code 3 must state their starting location (e.g. intersection or street address), after which the RTO broadcasts a Code 3 notification, announcing the unit number is responding Code 3 from that starting location to the location of the distress call.

Typical radio traffic (usually not simulcast citywide) includes the activity generated from traffic stops.  A patrol unit may radio control that they are Code 6 on a traffic stop, to which Control will acknowledge. Additional broadcasts will be requests for information on "Cal IDs", or "CalOps" (the numbers that appear at the top of California Department of Motor Vehicle driver licenses) or on vehicle license plates, the result of which provides all of the expected details about the subject plus important details such as whether or not the licensee has any wants or warrants, FTAs (failure to appear in court) or FTPs (failure to pay a fine), etc. In the case of a vehicle, this information can help check whether or not it is Code 37. Off the air and via MDT, officers can check to whom the vehicle is registered.

In the event a Code 6-Charles is broadcast, the unit in question must verify their location, advise if they are Code 4 and the nature of the Code 4 (e.g. suspect in custody, common name, information only or wrong suspect.)

A noticeable characteristic of police broadcasts is the expedited nature of crime broadcasts; due to the number of broadcasts that need to be made at any given moment of the day, each transmission is necessarily as brief as possible.  As a standard of police professionalism, RTOs are trained to use a tone that is strictly business-like.

Unit callsigns
From the perspective of control, each unit is represented by an LAPD-specific callsign. Typically, a callsign is made up of three elements: the division number, the unit type and the "beat" number. For example, division 1 is Central Division (or, now, "Central Area"), an "A" is patrol unit with two officers and their patrol area number can be a number like 12. Such a unit would identify themselves as 1A12 (or 1-Adam-12, using the LAPD phonetic alphabet). There are several types of units, designated by a letter:

The immediate supervisor of any patrol officer is called a field supervisor, which typically have beats that end in zero beginning from 2 through 7 (for example, 7-L-60 for a Wilshire Area supervisor). The watch commander is a usually a lieutenant I at a geographic division. Their radio code always ends in Lincoln-10 (e.g., the watch commander at division 6 or Hollywood Area station is always 6-L-10). The watch commander is responsible for the geographic area (e.g. "Southwest Area") and reports to the area patrol captain I.

Staff Unit Designations

Radio equipment
Officers out of their cars are able to communicate over the air using portable Motorola radios nicknamed ROVERs ("Remote Out of Vehicle Emergency Radios"). These hand-held radios are currently a mix of the new Motorola APX-8000 and Motorola XTS-5000 models, with some older Motorola Astro digital SABRE models still being used by very few officers and some still inside older police vehicles. ROVERs are normally gun belt-mounted. For convenience, smaller, corded, hand-held speaker-microphones can be plugged into these radios and then clipped to parts of the uniform shirt such as a front pocket or shoulder loop.

Originally, Motorola MX-series analog handheld units were used when the transition from VHF to UHF "T-band" dispatch/tactical frequencies was made in the early 1980s. Prior to that, portable 2-way radios (known in LAPD jargon then as "CC units") were either VHF or UHF, mainly Motorola HT-200s and HT-220s, stocked in small quantities, and used mainly by specialized units such as the Metropolitan Division, SWAT, Special Investigation Section, and Narcotics divisions as stakeout tools. Another use was for foot patrol units, mainly in Central Division, in the late 1970s and early 1980s.

Digital frequencies
After the parade in Los Angeles celebrating the Los Angeles Lakers 2001 NBA championship title, the LAPD switched from analog frequencies to digital frequencies. This ended a long-lasting era of the public having easy listening access to police broadcasts that started when the department had initially set up agreements with a local, commercial AM radio station to interrupt regularly scheduled programming for a crime broadcast. Officers were tuned to a specific radio station. However, as the amount of broadcasting needed increased, the department established its first transmission tower in Elysian Park and eventually began broadcasting over dozens of frequencies in the 400 MHz and 500 MHz ("T-band") ranges. These digital transmissions can be monitored on a proper Uniden Bearcat or Radio Shack digital scanner.

Ranks

 Specialized unit insignia are worn at the top of the sleeve beneath the shoulder for officers assigned to the traffic divisions. Officers assigned to area patrol divisions have historically not worn any departmental shoulder patch on their uniforms.
 Service stripes are worn above the left cuff on a long-sleeved shirt. Each silver stripe represents five years of service in the LAPD.

Supervisory terminology
The following names are used to describe supervision levels within the LAPD:

‡ As detectives are considered specialists within the LAPD, they are normally considered to be separate from the uniformed line of command. The senior-most detective is therefore permitted to take charge of an incident when it is necessary for investigative purposes, superseding the chain of command of other higher-ranking officers in attendance.

Technology and policing systems

Predictive Policing 
Predictive Policing is an approach to policing that uses algorithms to predict when future crimes are most likely to occur. Through artificial intelligence, data is gathered and used to identify suspicious patterns, locations, activity, and individuals. The technology is based on network models and risk models. Network models predict specific types of crime using information based on time and location to predict when and where to look for crimes. The prediction model utilizes geo-spatiality to provide information on crimes. In 2008, then-Chief William Bratton began working with federal agencies to assess the use of a more predictive approach to policing. Though certain cities such as Santa Cruz, Oakland, and New Orleans banned predictive policing over concerns surrounding its disproportional effects on racialized communities, the practice continues in the LAPD.

Los Angeles' Strategic Extraction and Restoration Program 
The Los Angeles’ Strategic Extraction and Restoration Program (LASER) began in 2011 and is a strategy that includes location-based and offender-based models. It began in 2011 and was funded by the Smart Policing Initiative. This program uses a point based system where individuals are assigned a LASER score, which is later used to evaluate their potential risk. This system was created with the intention of targeting individuals who are most likely to commit a crime based on data around crime history. Points are designed based on gang membership, violent crimes committed, and “quality” interaction with the police. Through this system, when individuals scored a high enough LASER score, they were put on a “chronic offenders bulletin” which was available to LAPD officers. After a report in 2018 found that 84% of the 233 people with high enough LASER scores to be labeled a "chronic offender" were Black and Latino, the LAPD shut down LASER.

PredPol 
The LAPD started using PredPol, a predictive policing software, in 2012. PredPol uses an algorithm to analyze data from LAPD record management systems and predict future crimes. It uses the near repeat model, which suggests that once there is a crime in a location, the surrounding area is immediately at increased risk for more crimes. Three aspects of offender behavior are incorporated into the algorithm that is informed by a decade of research on criminal patterns:

 Repeat victimization: if a crime is committed one day, the risk of it happening again goes up. This is based on the understanding that if an offender is successful in one area, they will come back because it is now less risky. 
 Near-repeat victimization: if a crime is committed next door, neighboring homes are now at higher risk because of the close proximity. 
 Local search: crimes tend to cluster together, because criminals are not likely to travel far from their key activity points such as home, work, and play.

Palantir 
Palantir is a platform where the LAPD uses data to send out reports to officers. The platform works by merging data from crime and arrest reports, automated license plate reader (ALPR), rap sheets and other sources. This platform uses “tagging,” which allows officers to tag people, vehicles, addresses, phone numbers, documents, incidents, citations, calls for service, ALPR, and field interview cards of interest. Through having Palantir on their cell phones, officers are automatically notified of warrants or events that involve the tagged entities.

References 

Resources